Superville is a surname. Notable people with the surname include:
 
 Daniel de Superville (disambiguation), multiple people
 David Pierre Giottino Humbert de Superville (1770–1849), Dutch artist and art scholar
 Jean Humbert de Superville (1734–1794), Dutch painter
 Lennox Superville (born 1942), Trinidadian-American professor, mathematician, and engineer
 Odile Baron Supervielle (1915-2016), Uruguayan-born Argentine writer, journalist